Martin Dougoud (born 19 May 1991) is a Swiss slalom canoeist who has competed at the international level since 2008. He is from Geneva, Switzerland but lives and trains in Pau, France. Martin competes in the single paddler K1 discipline.

He won a bronze medal in the K1 team event at the 2020 European Championships in Prague. He earned his best senior world championship result, of 15th, at the 2017 ICF Canoe Slalom World Championships in Pau.

Martin finished 19th at the 2019 ICF Canoe Slalom World Championships securing a quota place for Switzerland in the K1 event at the delayed 2020 Summer Olympics in Tokyo. The Swiss Olympic Selection Committee approved his nomination for the position on 11 November 2019. = He finished 13th at the Olympics after being eliminated in the semifinal.

World Cup individual podiums

References

External links 

 

1991 births
Living people
Swiss male canoeists
Canoeists at the 2020 Summer Olympics
Olympic canoeists of Switzerland
Sportspeople from Geneva